Corona is an Italian Eurodance project. Initially as a band originally formed by the Brazilian-born singer and model Olga Maria de Souza and the producer Francesco "Checco" Bontempi (a.k.a. Lee Marrow), it found commercial success with the worldwide hits "The Rhythm of the Night" (1993) and "Baby Baby" (1995). After the second album, Bontempi left the band and was replaced by Francesco Conte and Paolo Dughero.

History

Beginning of the band's career: 1993–1996 
Corona's first single, "The Rhythm of the Night", was released in Italy in November 1993 on Roberto Zanetti's DWA record label and became an instant hit. It featured the voice of the Italian singer Giovanna Bersola, better known by her stage name Jenny B. It stayed at number 1 on the Italian music chart for eight consecutive weeks, but was not released elsewhere until the following year. A remixed version of the song became a number 2 hit in the United Kingdom in September 1994. Like several early 1990s Eurodance/Hi-NRG songs that eventually became American hits, "The Rhythm of the Night" did not become popular in the United States until well after its success had peaked in Europe. However, by spring 1995, the song was all over American radio and clubs, eventually reaching #11 on the Billboard Hot 100. It was later released as a track in the 1995 studio album The Rhythm of the Night. Lead vocals for the remaining songs in the album were by the Welsh singer Sandy Chambers who also sang on the group's second album, Walking On Music.

Corona followed up with the 1995 singles "Baby Baby" and "Try Me Out", with similar success. The single "I Don't Wanna Be a Star" was a moderate hit. A fifth single, "Do You Want Me", became a regional hit in discotheques in the Eastern U.S. The Rhythm of the Night album sold modestly, peaking at #2 on the US Top Heatseekers chart and at #154 on the Billboard 200.

1996–2004 
In 1996, after the demise of Discomagic Records, DWA Records reorganized its staff due to internal conflicts. As a result, the production of Corona was moved from DWA Records to Bontempi's own label (World Of Music, which was also a sublabel of Discomagic).

The third album, And Me U, was released in 2001 by Brazil's Abril Music, under the name Corona X. This time the vocals were by new vocalists, the sisters Bernadette "Brandy" Jones and Bambi Jones' (who died of cancer in 2010). Again, de Souza was just the face but still not the voice, as many people thought. Although Bontempi co-wrote some of the material in the album, he did not participate in the production and left the band. In 2004, as a tribute to de Souza's native Brazil, Corona sang "A cor dos teus olhos" ("The Colour of Your Eyes") which was distributed by 5000. De Souza described the song like an imprint of her childhood memory. It was an immediate hit. The same year "Garota Brasileira", a song with spicy samba sounds, became a hit in Japan.

2005–2009 
Towards the end of 2005, Souza finally sang on the records for the first time and re-emerged onto the European music scene with "Back in Time", peaking at #36 in the Italian charts. It was followed by "I’ll Be Your Lady" (2006), the first song co-authored by de Souza.

2010–2016 
Corona's album Y Generation (2010), reached #1 on the Italian iTunes dance album chart. The first single was "Angel"”, followed by "Saturday" and "My Song". Corona's last single, "Super Model" reached #44 on the Italian Singles Chart and was later included in a re-edition of the album called Y Generation Remixed.

Discography

Studio albums

Singles

References

External links
 

Italian electronic music groups
Italian Eurodance groups
Italian house music groups
Italian pop music groups